This article lists a timeline of notable political rivalries by country. Political party rivalries are not to be confused with rival family houses within a nation, or warring factions from different nations. This list will not indicate every rival political party within a nation, such as in multiple-party governments. Only the most notable and significant political parties are presented. Rival political alliances may be included as well.

Ancient to Medieval rivalries

Roman Republic

Early modern to present

Albania

Argentina

Australia

Austria

Bangladesh

Bulgaria

Cambodia

Canada

Chile

China

Colombia

Croatia

Cyprus

Czech Republic

Denmark

France

Georgia

Germany

Ghana

Greece

Hong Kong

Hungary

India

Indonesia

Ireland

Israel

Italy

Jamaica

Japan

Macau

Malaysia

Malta

Mexico

Mongolia

Myanmar

New Zealand

North Macedonia

Norway

Philippines 

Starting in 1992, sextennial presidential elections allows political realignment to take place, with administration (government) and opposition coalitions taking shape. These won't become apparent after the election, and cements into the mid-term election three years later. The process repeats in the next presidential election.

Poland

Portugal

Russia

Singapore

South Africa

South Korea

Spain

Sweden

Taiwan

Thailand

Turkey

United Kingdom

United States

Venezuela

Elections
Political history
Political parties
Political timelines